Africa is a 2013 British television series created by the BBC Natural History Unit. It focuses on wildlife and wild habitats in Africa, and was four years in the making. It consists of six hour-long episodes and six 10-minute-long featurettes.

Broadcast

As Africa was broadcast on BBC One in the United Kingdom, the six episodes are each an hour in length, comprising the main programme and a 10-minute featurette called Eye to Eye which details the filming of a particular event.

In the United States, Africa was broadcast as a seven-part series on the Discovery Channel starting from 8 January 2013. While the first five episodes are redubbed in the American version as Forest Whitaker gives narration, the sixth ("Africa: The Future") is left untouched as David Attenborough presents the episode on-screen. The seventh is a compilation of the Eye to Eye making-of featurettes.

In China, it was broadcast on the Chinese language version of CCTV-9.

In Singapore, only five episodes of Africa are broadcast on Mediacorp Okto on Animal Nights. The Animal Nights from 15 July 2013 to 24 July 2013 was used to broadcast the documentary. Each telecast was on the Mondays, Wednesdays, and Fridays of the week from 9pm-10pm.

Episodes

Reception
The series received critical acclaim.

Merchandise

DVD and Blu-ray
The series was released in the UK as a three-disc DVD (BBCDVD3741) and Blu-ray (BBCBD0227) box set on 18 February 2013. Region 1 DVD and Blu-ray box sets of the Discovery series were released on 26 February 2013.

Book
An accompanying hardcover book called Africa: Eye to Eye with the Unknown was published by Quercus on 6 December 2012. It was written by Michael Bright, a former BBC Natural History Unit producer, with a foreword by David Attenborough. The book is divided into chapters which correspond to the six programmes in the TV series. A separate chapter explains how the series was made.

Soundtrack
A soundtrack (silcd1421) was released on 18 March 2013.

Calendar
An official 2014 calendar was released on 16 September 2013.

References

External links
 
 Africa at BBC Earth
 

BBC high definition shows
BBC television documentaries
2010s British documentary television series
2013 British television series debuts
2013 British television series endings
Discovery Channel original programming
Documentary films about nature
David Attenborough